Sävstaholm Castle (Sävstaholms slott) is a castle in  Vingåker Municipality, Södermanland County, Sweden. the name is sometimes spelled Säfstaholm, which is according to old Swedish spelling rules.

History
The palace was  built during 1666 by Gustav Larsson Sparre (1625-1689), a Swedish baron, diplomat, and governor. Since 1968, it has been owned by Vingåker Municipality.

See also
List of castles in Sweden

References

Other sources
Furborg, Lars (1994) En konstepok på Säfstaholm 1797-1855 (Vingåkers kommun)

External links
Säfstaholms slott

Castles in Södermanland County
1666 establishments in Sweden